Apolemichthys trimaculatus, the threespot angelfish or flagfin angelfish,  is a  demersal marine ray-finned fish, a marine angelfish belonging to the family Pomacanthidae. It has a wide Indo-Pacific distribution.

Description
Apolemichthys trimaculatus is a bright yellow species of angelfish which has blue lips, a wide black margin to the anal fin, a black spot on the forehead and an faint spot just to the rear of the operculum. The juveniles do not have the spots and show a thin black band running vertically through the eye and vertical golden barring on the flanks. The dorsal fin contains 14 spines and 16-18 soft rays while the anal fin has 3 spines and 17-19 soft rays.

Distribution
Apolemichthys trimaculatus is widely distributed throughout the tropical waters of the Indian Ocean from the coast of East Africa between Tanzania and Mozambique to the western Pacific Ocean where it reaches as Far East as Samoa, as far north as southern Japan and as far south as New Caledonia. In Australia it is found at Ningaloo Reef, Rowley Shoals and Scott Reef all in Western Australia; Ashmore Reef in the Timor Sea and the Great Barrier Reef in Queensland.

Habitat and biology
Apolemichthys trimaculatus is found at depths of  where it lives on outer coral reef slopes and drop-offs. Here it feeds mainly on benthic invertebrates, mainly sponges and tunicates, although crustaceans are also taken. Adults are normally encountered at moderate depths in small, loosely organised groups.

Threespot angelfish has a diurnal activity. It is protogynous hermaphrodite, which means the female can evolved to male during its life, and lives in harem composed of two to seven females for a male and it's a territorial fish.

Systematics
Apolemichthys trimaculatus Was first formally described as Holacanthus trimaculatus in 1831 by the French anatomist Georges Cuvier (1769-1832) with the type locality given as the Molucca Islands.

Utilisation
Apolemichthys trimaculatus is frequently found in the aquarium trade.

References

External links
 

trimaculatus
Fish described in 1831
Taxa named by Georges Cuvier